Igor Galinovskiy (born 8 November 1985) is a Russian rugby union footballer. He plays as a wing.

He has 50 caps for Russia, with 18 tries scored, 90 points in aggregate, from 2006 to 2018.

He is best known for scoring a hat-trick at the 2006 London Sevens Tournament against Australia at Twickenham. This meant Russia had a shock win against the rugby giants, 21-5.

External links

1985 births
Living people
Russian rugby union players
Russia international rugby union players
Rugby union wings
Universiade gold medalists for Russia
Universiade medalists in rugby sevens
Medalists at the 2013 Summer Universiade